The 2016 NASCAR Whelen Euro Series is the eighth Racecar Euro Series season, and the fourth under the NASCAR Whelen Euro Series branding. Ander Vilariño enters the season as the defending champion, although he does not defend his title.

Rules changes 
The NASCAR Whelen Euro Series presented a new technical package at the Circuit Zolder Finals on October 2, 2015. The package includes improvements to the braking system, suspensions and a revised aerodynamic configuration. The Chevrolet SS body was unveiled at Zolder, while the Ford Mustang body made its debut on December 5, 2015 in a testing session at Fontenay Le Comte, France.

Teams and drivers

Elite 1 Division

Elite 2 Division

Driver changes 
 Freddy Nordström moved from GDL Racing to CAAL Racing.
 Ander Vilariño will leave the series, leaving TFT Racing for other racing opportunities.

Schedule and results
The schedule was announced in October 2015.

Elite 1

Elite 2

Standings

Elite 1
(key) Bold - Pole position awarded by time. Italics - Fastest lap. * – Most laps led.

Elite 2
(key) Bold - Pole position awarded by time. Italics - Fastest lap. * – Most laps led.

See also 

2016 NASCAR Sprint Cup Series
2016 NASCAR Xfinity Series
2016 NASCAR Camping World Truck Series
2016 NASCAR K&N Pro Series East
2016 NASCAR K&N Pro Series West
2016 NASCAR Whelen Modified Tour
2016 NASCAR Whelen Southern Modified Tour
2016 NASCAR Pinty's Series

References

External links
 

NASCAR Whelen Euro Series seasons
NASCAR Whelen Euro Series